Desmaria is a monotypic genus of flowering plants belonging to the family Loranthaceae. The only species is Desmaria mutabilis.

Its native range is Chile.

References

Loranthaceae
Loranthaceae genera
Monotypic Santalales genera